The Blue Key Victory Bell is presented to the winner of the college football game between Indiana State University and Ball State University. The two schools met regularly between 1924 and 1991 but sporadically since that season. They have competed for the Victory Bell since 1940; from 1924 to 1947 they were Indiana Intercollegiate Conference rivals and from 1951 to 1967 they were Indiana Collegiate Conference rivals. Ball State was a regional campus of Indiana State University from 1918 to 1961; since the 1961–62 academic year, Ball State has operated independently.

History
Early in the series, games would be played either at Terre Haute, Indiana (hosted by Indiana State) or Muncie, Indiana (hosted by Ball State). The first two games between the schools took place at Terre Haute in 1924 and 1925; then the series between the schools continued on a near home-and-home basis from 1931 to 1983.  From 1984 to 1989, the games were played at a neutral site, Hoosier Dome in Indianapolis; during this era, Indiana State moved down to Division I-AA (now Division I FCS) while Ball State remained Division I-A (now Division I FBS). The last home-and-home cycle for this game was in 1990 and 1991. Since 2002, all games in this series have been played in Muncie. The Victory Bell continues to be the official game trophy, even though the Ball State/Indiana state series has become less frequent since the 1990s.

In 1940, the Blue Key chapters at both Indiana State and Ball State agreed to donate a bell to the winner of the football game between their two schools.

On September 13, 2014, Indiana State beat Ball State for their first win over Ball State since 1987. The two schools are scheduled to meet again on September 16, 2023.

Game results

See also  
 List of NCAA college football rivalry games

References

College football rivalries in the United States
College football rivalry trophies in the United States
Ball State Cardinals football
Indiana State Sycamores football